In botany, a virtual herbarium is a herbarium in a digitized form. That is, it concerns a collection of digital images of preserved plants or plant parts. Virtual herbaria often are established to improve availability of specimens to a wider audience. However, there are digital herbaria that are not suitable for internet access because of the high resolution of scans and resulting large file sizes (several hundred megabytes per file). Additional information about each specimen, such as the location, the collector, and the botanical name are attached to every specimen. Frequently, further details such as related species and growth requirements are mentioned.

Specimen imaging 
The standard hardware used for herbarium specimen imaging is the "HerbScan" scanner. It is an inverted flat-bed scanner which raises the specimen up to the scanning surface. This technology was developed because it is standard practice to never turn a herbarium specimen upside-down. Alternatively, some herbaria employ a flat-bed book scanner or a copy stand to achieve the same effect.

A small color chart and a ruler must be included on a herbarium sheet when it is imaged. The JSTOR Plant Science requires that the ruler bears the herbarium name and logo, and that a ColorChecker chart is used for any specimens to be contributed to the Global Plants Initiative (GPI).

Uses 

Virtual herbaria are established in part to increase the longevity of specimens. Major herbaria participate in international loan programs, where a researcher can request specimens to be shipped in for study. This shipping contributes to the wear and tear of specimens. If, however, digital images are available, images of the specimens can be sent electronically. These images may be a sufficient substitute for the specimens themselves, or alternatively, the researcher can use the images to "preview" the specimens, to which ones should be sent out for further study. This process cuts down on the shipping, and thus the wear and tear of the specimens, as well as the wait times associated with shipping.

Virtual herbaria can also be used to increase public awareness of herbaria. Some herbaria make their specimen databases publicly available on the Internet. Digital images of specimens can be added to these databases to allow the public to further engage with the material. Some herbaria also capitalize on their images by selling herbarium prints and greeting cards featuring particularly attractive specimens.

Five task clusters for digitization 

 pre-digitization curation and staging
 specimen image capture
 specimen image processing
 electronic data capture, and 
 georeferencing specimen data

See also 
Herbar Digital

External links
 Indian Virtual Herbarium
  Tropicos (Missouri Botanical Garden)
 Europeana Collections (High quality scans of the collections of several important European herbaria such as Kew)
 Kew Herbarium Catalogue
  Australia's Virtual Herbarium
  United States Virtual Herbarium
 Louisiana State University Virtual Herbarium
 Botanic Garden Meise Virtual Herbarium
 University of the Balearic Islands Virtual Herbarium
 University of Connecticut Virtual Herbarium
 Utah Valley University Virtual Herbarium
 Virtual Herbarium of the Botanic Garden and Botanical Museum Berlin-Dahlem, Freie Universität Berlin
 The Virtual Herbarium at The New York Botanical Garden
  JSTOR Plant Science
 Reflora Virtual Herbarium
  Moscow Digital Herbarium: 786K scans online
 Harvard University Herbaria & Libraries
 Digital Herbarium of Angiospermic Plants of Western Ghat Regions of Maharashtra
 Digital Herbarium of Selected Indian Medicinal Plants
 Digital Flora of Karnataka
 BRIT Virtual Herbarium

References 

Herbaria
Virtual herbarium